The North Bay Centennials were a junior ice hockey team in the Ontario Hockey League, who played from 1982–2002. The team was based in North Bay, Ontario.

History
The North Bay Centennials or "Cents" as they were popularly known, were named after the 100th anniversary of the railroad in North Bay. The team came to the city in 1982 after the new owners of the Niagara Falls Flyers failed to get a deal for a new arena, and chose to relocate to North Bay which already had an adequate facility in operation. 

The team can trace its roots back to St. Catharines, Ontario, where it played from 1943–1976, as the Falcons, Teepees and Black Hawks, winning the Memorial Cup in 1954 and 1960. 

The Centennials won back-to-back Emms division titles in 1986 and 1987. In 1987 the OHL organized a Super Series for the right to host the Memorial Cup tournament between the Leyden Division champions Oshawa Generals, and the Emms Division champions North Bay Centennials. The super series was played while the first round of the playoffs was taking place (at the time, regular season division champions would receive a bye and advance to the second round of the postseason). North Bay came within one game of hosting the national junior championship, losing game seven to the Oshawa Generals. In the OHL championship series that year the Centennials and Generals faced off again with the same result, Oshawa defeating North Bay 4 games to 3.  Since the Oshawa Generals were both host and champion, a revision to the Memorial Cup format was made where it was reduced to a three team tournament and the North Bay Centennials eliminated.  It was the first three team tournament since 1982 and to this day it is the last 3-team tournament.

Determined to return to the Memorial Cup, coach and general manager Bert Templeton began building his team for another championship run. In 1991–92 North Bay would return to the OHL finals, losing to their northern counterparts, the Sault Ste. Marie Greyhounds in seven games. Templeton was awarded the OHL Executive of the Year for the 1991–92 season. 

Two years later in 1994, North Bay was on top of the league winning the Hamilton Spectator Trophy. They entered the playoffs as the #1 ranked junior team in Canada. This time the Centennials would prevail in the finals by defeating the Detroit Junior Red Wings in seven games. Injuries began to take their toll on the team as they headed to the 1994 Memorial Cup, played in Laval, Quebec. North Bay dropped all three games on the round-robin; losing 5-4 to the Laval Titan, 3-1 to the Chicoutimi Saguenéens, and 5-1 to the Kamloops Blazers.

Templeton was awarded the Ontario Hockey League and Canadian Hockey League Coach of the Year in 1994. He asked for a raise in renegotiating his contract. When the raise was not given, Templeton and the Centennials parted ways. 

After Bert Templeton was let go, the Centennials fell on hard times with many losing seasons. The Cents never regained their previous form and attendance dropped off yearly. 

For the 1999–2000 season, the Centennials released new uniforms with an updated logo to boost retail sales. However, profits were still declining. Combined with an aging facility, the team became unprofitable and was ultimately sold to a group of American investors in 2002, and moved to Saginaw, Michigan to become the Saginaw Spirit.

The community of North Bay went nine years without the OHL until 2012, when the Brampton Battalion announced they were relocating to the city, keeping the Battalion moniker for the franchise.

Championships
The Centennials best year was 1994, when the team was first overall in the regular season, won the league championship and made the trip to the national championship. North Bay also won three division titles, and made three trips to the OHL championship series.

Division Trophies
1985–86 Emms Division
1986–87 Emms Division
1993–94 Leyden Division

Hamilton Spectator Trophy
1993–94 46 wins, 5 ties, 97 points

J. Ross Robertson Cup
 1987 Lost to Oshawa Generals
 1992 Lost to S.S.Marie Greyhounds
 1994 Champions vs. Detroit Jr. Red Wings

Memorial Cup
 1994 4th place in Laval, Quebec

Coaches
In twenty years of operation, the North Bay Centennials had four coaches. The legendary Bert Templeton carried over from Niagara Falls and guided the team for its first twelve years in North Bay. He later became the team's general manager in addition to coaching. He was awarded the OHL Executive of the Year for the 1991–92 season. 

When the Centennials won the championship in 1994, Templeton was awarded the Matt Leyden Trophy as OHL Coach of the Year, and the CHL Coach of the Year Award. He asked for a raise in renegotiating his contract. Failing which, Templeton and the Centennials parted ways. 

Shane Parker took over for two and a half seasons, replaced by Greg Bignell for a year and a half. Mike Kelly coached the last four years. He resigned when the team departed North Bay.

1982–1994 - Bert Templeton (12 years)
1994–1996 - Shane Parker (2.5 years)
1997–1998 - Greg Bignell (1.5 years)
1998–2002 - Mike Kelly (4 years)

Players

Award winners
1987-88 - Len Soccio, Leo Lalonde Memorial Trophy (Overage Player of the Year)
1991–92 - Drake Berehowsky, CHL Defenceman of the Year & Max Kaminsky Trophy (Most Outstanding Defenceman, OHL)
1991–92 - John Spoltore, Leo Lalonde Memorial Trophy (Overage Player of the Year) & William Hanley Trophy (Most Sportsmanlike Player)
1991–92 - Sandy Allan, F. W. "Dinty" Moore Trophy (Best Rookie GAA)
1993–94 - Vitali Yachmenev, CHL Rookie of the Year & Emms Family Award (Rookie of the Year, OHL)
1993–94 - B. J. MacPherson, Leo Lalonde Memorial Trophy (Overage Player of the Year)
1993–94 - Sandy Allan & Scott Roche, Dave Pinkney Trophy (Lowest Team GAA)
1993–94 - Scott Roche, F. W. "Dinty" Moore Trophy (Best Rookie GAA)
1994–95 - Brad Brown, Dan Snyder Memorial Trophy (Humanitarian of the Year)
1994–95 - Vitali Yachmenev, William Hanley Trophy (Most Sportsmanlike Player)

NHL alumni

Jonas Andersson
Shawn Antoski
Alex Auld
Drake Berehowsky
Paul Bissonnette
Jeff Bloemberg
Dennis Bonvie
Brad Brown
Adam Burt
Tony Cimellaro
Troy Crowder
Rob Davison
Andy Delmore
Jeff Eatough
Todd Elik
Trevor Gillies
Paul Gillis
Trevor Halverson
Mike Hartman
Derian Hatcher
Kevin Hatcher
Bill Houlder
Nick Kypreos
Bob LaForest
Mark LaForest
Mark LaVarre
Mark Lawrence
Brett MacDonald
Jason MacDonald
Mark Major
Andrew McBain
Steve McLaren
Dave McLlwain
Ron Meighan
Steve Montador
Chris Neil
Keith Osborne
Chad Penney
Geoff Platt
John Purves
Joe Reekie
Jeff Shevalier
Chris Thorburn
Tom Thornbury
Darren Turcotte
Vitali Yachmenev

Season-by-season results

Regular season

Playoffs
1982–83 Defeated Windsor Spitfires 6 points to 0 in first round. Lost to Kitchener Rangers 8 points to 2 in quarter-finals.
1983–83 Lost to London Knights 6 points to 2 in first round.
1984–85 Lost to Hamilton Steelhawks 9 points to 7 in first round.
1985–86 Defeated London Knights 9 points to 1 in first round. Eliminated in round robin vs. Guelph Platers and Windsor Spitfires. (1 win in 4 games)
1986–87 Lost to Oshawa Generals 4 games to 3 in Super Series. Earned first round bye. Defeated Kitchener Rangers 4 games to 0 in quarter-finals. Defeated Windsor Spitfires 4 games to 2 in semi-finals. Lost to Oshawa Generals 4 games to 3 in finals.
1987–88 Lost to Hamilton Steelhawks 4 games to 0 in first round.
1988–89 Defeated Kitchener Rangers 4 games to 1 in first round. Lost to London Knights 4 games to 3 in quarter-finals.
1989–90 Lost to Kitchener Rangers 4 games to 1 in first round.
1990–91 Defeated Peterborough Petes 4 games to 0 in first round. Lost to Ottawa 67's 4 games to 2 in quarter-finals.
1991–92 Defeated Belleville Bulls 4 games to 1 in first round. Defeated Sudbury Wolves 4 games to 0 in quarter-finals. Defeated Peterborough Petes 4 games to 1 in semi-finals. Lost to S.S.Marie Greyhounds 4 games to 3 in finals.
1992–93 Lost to Kingston Frontenacs 4 games to 1 in first round.
1993–94 Earned bye through division quarter-finals. Defeated Belleville Bulls 4 games to 2 in division semi-finals. Defeated Ottawa 67's 4 games to 1 in division finals. Defeated Detroit Jr. Red Wings 4 games to 3 in finals. OHL CHAMPIONS Eliminated in the Memorial Cup round-robin finishing winless.
1994–95 Lost to Belleville Bulls 4 games to 2 in division quarter-finals.
1995–96 Out of playoffs.
1996–97 Out of playoffs.
1997–98 Out of playoffs.
1998–99 Lost to Ottawa 67's 4 games to 0 in conference quarter-finals.
1999–2000 Lost to Barrie Colts 4 games to 2 in conference quarter-finals.
2000–01 Lost to Ottawa 67's 4 games to 0 in conference quarter-finals.
2001–02 Defeated Kingston Frontenacs 6-2 in tie-breaker game for 8th place. Lost to St. Michael's Majors 4 games to 0 in conference quarter-finals.

Uniforms and logos

The North Bay Centennials logo from 1982 to 1999 used the Centennials name and four wheels to form the shape of a locomotive engine. Home jerseys were white with black and gold trim. Away jerseys were black with white and gold trim. North Bay later wore a third jersey with a gold background with black and white trim. Shoulder patches featured a front view of a locomotive on tracks.

The Centennials new logo from 1999 to 2002 was an angry hockey stick wielding railroad engineer above the name of the team. Home jerseys were white with black and gold trim. Away jerseys were black with white and gold trim. The new jerseys had the previous main logo as shoulder patches.

Arena
The Centennials played their home games at the North Bay Memorial Gardens. The Gardens was built in 1955 and currently is home to the North Bay Battalion, and also hosted the 1998 OHL All-Star game.

External links
 North Bay Memorial Gardens The OHL Arena & Travel Guide

Defunct Ontario Hockey League teams
Sport in North Bay, Ontario
1982 establishments in Ontario
2002 disestablishments in Ontario
Ice hockey clubs established in 1982
Sports clubs disestablished in 2002